Limnia boscii is a species of marsh fly in the family Sciomyzidae.

References

Further reading

External links

 

Sciomyzidae
Insects described in 1830